Henry Catchpole may refer to:

Henry Catchpole (fl. 1361–1386), MP for Hereford 1361–1386
Henry Catchpole (fl. 1390), MP for Hereford in 1390, son of the above